Hluboká Castle is a historic château situated in Hluboká nad Vltavou. It is considered one of the most beautiful castles in the Czech Republic.

Tourism
Hluboká is one of the most famous and most frequently visited castles in the country. As of 2019, it was the 3rd most visited castle with 293,000 visitors.

History

In the second half of the 13th century, a Gothic castle was built at the site. During its history, the castle was rebuilt several times. It was first expanded during the Renaissance period, then rebuilt into a Baroque castle at the order of Adam Franz von Schwarzenberg in the beginning of the 18th century. It reached its current appearance during the 19th century, when Johann Adolf II von Schwarzenberg ordered the reconstruction of the castle in the romantic style of England's Windsor Castle.

The Schwarzenbergs obtained the castle in 1661 when Johann Adolf, Prince of Schwarzenberg bought it from the heirs of Baltasar Marradas. They lived in Hluboká until the end of 1939, when the last owner (Adolph Schwarzenberg) emigrated overseas to escape from the Nazis. The Schwarzenbergs lost all of their Czech property through a special legislative Act, the Lex Schwarzenberg, in 1947.

Hluboká Castle is a National Cultural Monument of the Czech Republic.

Additional information
The original royal castle of Ottokar II from the second half of the 13th century was rebuilt at the end of the 16th century by the Lords of Hradec. It received its present appearance under Count Jan Adam of Schwarzenberg. According to the English Windsor example, architects Franz Beer and F. Deworetzky built a Romantic Neo-Gothic château, surrounded by a  English park here in the years 1841 to 1871.  In 1940, the castle was seized from the last owner, Adolph Schwarzenberg by the Gestapo and confiscated by the government of Czechoslovakia after the end of World War II. The castle is opened to the public. There is a winter garden and riding-hall where the Southern Bohemian gallery exhibitions have been housed since 1956.

In popular culture
The castle has been used in a scene of the movie Shanghai Knights. The castle has also been used as a location for the Eastern Coven in the movie Underworld: Blood Wars. In 2019, K-pop soloist Park Jihoon released his song L.O.V.E. and the music video was filmed in the castle.

References

External links

Official website (in English)
Official website (in Czech)
Town of Hluboká nad Vltavou

České Budějovice District
Castles in the South Bohemian Region
Museums in the South Bohemian Region
Historic house museums in the Czech Republic
National Cultural Monuments of the Czech Republic